The Women's 500m Time Trial was one of the 6 women's events at the 2005 UCI Track Cycling World Championships, held in Los Angeles, United States.

18 Cyclists from 14 countries were due to participate in the contest, Christin Muche of Germany did not start. The Final was held on March 24 at 19:35.

World record

Final

References

Women's 500 m time trial
UCI Track Cycling World Championships – Women's 500 m time trial